There have been two baronetcies created for members of the Sandys family, both in the Baronetage of England. Both creations are extinct.

The Sandys Baronetcy, of Wilberton in the County of Cambridge, was created in the Baronetage of England on 25 November 1611 for Sir Miles Sandys, Member of Parliament for Cambridge, Huntingdon and Cambridgeshire.  He was the third son of Edwin Sandys, Archbishop of York. Sandys was succeeded by his eldest son, Miles, the second Baronet, who had already been knighted. The title became extinct when the latter died childless in 1654.

The Sandys Baronetcy, of Northborne in the County of Kent, was created in the Baronetage of England on 15 December 1684 for the fourteen-year-old Richard Sandys. He was the grandson of Edwin Sandys, of Northbourne Court, a colonel in the parliamentary army, elder son of Sir Edwin Sandys, second son of Edwin Sandys, Archbishop of York, and elder brother of Sir Miles Sandys, 1st Baronet, of Wilberton (see above). Sandys left only daughters and the title became extinct on his death in 1726.

Sir Samuel Sandys, of Ombersley, eldest brother of Sir Miles Sandys, 1st Baronet, of Wilberton, was the ancestor of the Barons Sandys (of the 1743 and 1802 creations). George Sandys, seventh son of Edwin Sandys, Archbishop of York, was a traveller and poet. Miles Sandys, brother of Edwin Sandys, Archbishop of York, was a courtier and politician.

The family surname is pronounced "Sands".

Sandys baronets, of Wilberton (1611)
 Sir Miles Sandys, 1st Baronet (1563–1645)
 Sir Miles Sandys, 2nd Baronet (died 1654)

Sandys baronets, of Northborne (1684)
 Sir Richard Sandys, 1st Baronet (1670–1726)

Family tree

See also
 Bayntun-Sandys Baronets
Baron Sandys

References

 

Extinct baronetcies in the Baronetage of England
1611 establishments in England